Statistics of Football League First Division in the 1961-62 season.

Overview
Ipswich Town won the First Division title for the first time in the club's history that season.

League standings

Results

Top scorers

References

RSSSF

Football League First Division seasons
Eng
1961–62 Football League
1961–62 in English football leagues

lt:Anglijos futbolo varžybos 1961–1962 m.
hu:1961–1962-es angol labdarúgó-bajnokság (első osztály)
ru:Футбольная лига Англии 1961-1962